The 2014 Ice Challenge was a senior international figure skating competition held in November 2014 at the Liebenauer Eishalle in Graz, Austria. It was part of the 2014–15 ISU Challenger Series. Medals were awarded in the disciplines of men's singles, ladies' singles, pair skating, and ice dancing.

Results

Men

Ladies

Pairs

Ice dancing

References

External links
 
 2014 Ice Challenge results,  

Ice Challenge
Ice Challenge, 2014
Ice Challenge